Anastrangalia reyi reyi is a subspecies of beetle from family Cerambycidae, that can be found in such European countries as Austria, Belarus, Czech Republic, Finland, France, Germany, Italy, Poland, Slovakia, Sweden, Switzerland, Ukraine, and the Baltic states.

References

Lepturinae
Beetles described in 1889
Beetles of Europe